The Centre (also spelled 'Center') for Peace and Spirituality International (CPS International) was founded by Maulana Wahiduddin Khan in 2001 (New Delhi) to promote interfaith dialogue and reinforce the culture of peace. CPS International is said to encourage its member to become 'ambassadors of peace' by promoting positivity and interfaith dialogue.

The organization website says CPS International draws inspiration from the Quran and Sunnah and seeks to share the spiritual principles of Islam with the world. CPS International, with the support of Goodword Books, is also a global distributor of Quran translations.

Maulana Wahiduddin Khan 
Maulana Wahiduddin Khan (1925–2021) promoted inter-faith dialogue and harmony. He believed in the power of dialogue and believed conversation between religious leaders has to be based on mutual respect. Khan was prolific writer and was awarded the Padma Vibhushan, India's second-highest civilian award, for his contributions towards peace and spirituality.

Notable members 
 Wahiduddin Khan, Founder
 Saniyasnain Khan, Trustee and Secretary
 Rajat Malhotra, International Global Coordinator
 Prof. Farida Khanam, Chairperson

References 

Peace organisations based in India